Rosemary Blaire Leith, Lady Berners-Lee (born in September 1961) is a director of both profit and nonprofit organizations.  Leith co-founded the World Wide Web Foundation together with her husband-to-be, Tim Berners-Lee in 2009.

Life
Leith was born in September 1961, in Toronto, Ontario, and studied at Queen's University at Kingston.  She moved to London in the late 1980s.

During the dot-com bubble at the end of the twentieth century, Leith co-founded the webzine Flametree with Jayne Buxton, an acquaintance from Queen's who also lived in West London.  At this time Leith is quoted as saying: "Women go on the net with a purpose, not to play. They have less free time and are solution-driven. They want well-grounded advice that will help them to get things done."

In 2009 Leith co-founded the World Wide Web Foundation with Tim Berners-Lee, who had invented the web. She is a fellow at Harvard’s Berkman Klein Center for Internet & Society.

Leith is active in a number of arts organisations, advising on strategy and fundraising. She was appointed, with Katrin Henkel, as trustees of the National Gallery in London for a four-year term from March 2016.  It was announced in December 2020 that both had had their terms extended for another four years to November 2024, Leith's contributions to various board of directors of arts institutions in London over the previous 20 years being noted.

Directorships include YouGov, an international research and data analytics group.

In June 2021, at Sotheby’s, Berners-Lee auctioned the source code from the web as a non-fungible token (NFT). The proceeds, some $5,434,500, were reported to be put towards initiatives by the husband and wife team.

Personal life
She was married to Mark Opzoomer, with whom she had three children. They lived in Fulham, West London.

In 2014 she married Tim Berners-Lee. The wedding was held at the Chapel Royal, St James’s Palace.

References

Notes

Footnotes

Sources
 
 
 
 
 
 
 
 
 
 
 
 

1961 births
Living people
Queen's University at Kingston alumni
People from Toronto
Wives of knights